Nasser 56 is a 1996 Egyptian historical film directed by Mohammed Fadel, starring Ahmed Zaki. The film focuses on the nationalization of the Suez Canal by Egypt's second President, Gamal Abdel Nasser, and the subsequent Suez War with Israel, the United Kingdom, and France.

Throughout the film, events are depicted from an Egyptian nationalist viewpoint. The film's star, Ahmed Zaki, subsequently portrayed Nasser's successor as President, Anwar Sadat, in the 2001 film The Days of Sadat.

References

Egyptian drama films
1996 films
Documentary films about Egypt
Suez Crisis films
Cultural depictions of Gamal Abdel Nasser